Cycling competitions at the 2022 South American Games in Asuncion, Paraguay were held between October 2 and 15, 2022 at the Agua Vista, Pista de BMX Freestyle, Pista BMX Racing - COP, Costanera José Asunción Flores and Velódromo del COP.

Schedule
The competition schedule is as follows:

Medal summary

Medal table

Medalists

BMX freestyle

BMX racing

Mountain biking

Road cycling

Track cycling

Men

Women

Participation
Fourteen nations participated in cycling events of the 2022 South American Games.

References

Cycling
South American Games
2022
2022 South American Games